Adolphe is a 2002 French drama film based on the novel Adolphe by Benjamin Constant.  The film was directed by Benoît Jacquot and starred Isabelle Adjani as Ellénore and Stanislas Merhar as Adolphe.

Cast 

 Isabelle Adjani - Ellénore
 Stanislas Merhar - Adolphe
 Jean Yanne - Count
 Romain Duris - D'Erfeuil
 Jean-Louis Richard - Mr. d'Arbigny
 Anne Suarez -  Mrs. d'Arbigny
 Jacqueline Jehanneuf - Aunt Choupie
 Jean-Marc Stehlé : Adolphe's father
 Maryline Even : La femme de chambre
 Bernard Ballet : The prefect
 Isild Le Besco : La lingère
 Pierre Charras : Le valet de chambre
 Rémy Roubakha : Le concierge
 François Chattot : The ambassador
 John Arnold : Le secrétaire d'ambassade
 Maurice Bernart : Le monsieur
 Isabelle Caubère : La femme du concierge
 Christophe Lavalle : Le laquais d'ambassade

External links 
 

French drama films
2002 films
Films directed by Benoît Jacquot
Films based on French novels
2000s French-language films
2000s French films